Playing for Keeps is a 2012 American romantic comedy film directed by Gabriele Muccino, starring Gerard Butler with Jessica Biel, Catherine Zeta-Jones, Dennis Quaid, Uma Thurman and Judy Greer in supporting roles. The film was released on December 7, 2012, in the United States and Canada by FilmDistrict. It received negative reviews from critics and was a box office bomb, grossing just $27.8 million on a $55 million budget.

Plot
George Dryer is a former professional Scottish football player who played for Celtic, Liverpool, A. C. Milan, D.C. United and the Scotland national team. He is largely seen as a "has been", and his attempts to sell his sports memorabilia and become a sports announcer are met with ambivalence. His relationship with his son Lewis is equally unsuccessful. When he discovers his ex-wife Stacie is marrying her boyfriend Matt, George grows despondent.

After dropping off an audition tape of him practicing sports announcements, George goes to help Lewis’ soccer practice. The team's parents pressure Stacie to ask George to become the new coach, and he reluctantly agrees. George is bribed by Carl King to give his children preferential treatment, and attracts the attention of the divorced Barb, ex-sportscaster Denise, and Carl's wife Patti. Denise is particularly forward, sending George an email that she is thinking of him.

At practice, George is invited to a dinner party at Carl's house, is approached by Barb, and is told by Denise that she has been given a copy of his audition tape to watch and pass along. At Carl's party, George learns Carl has been having affairs; unbeknownst to Carl, Patti knows. Carl lends George a Ferrari under the implication that he "takes care of his friends", which George drives to see Stacie. They discuss their relationship, but Stacie says that she does not wonder about the past anymore.

Returning home, George finds Barb waiting. She confesses her loneliness, and shows him her plans to start dating again, and he compliments her. This results in her seducing him and having sex together. The next morning, Barb leaves a Thank You note, and Carl calls George, asking him to pick up money from Patti to bail him out of jail, as he got into a fight at the party. Doing so makes George late to pick up his son, but he entertains Lewis by letting him ride in his lap and drive the Ferrari. George discovers Lewis is sad that his mother is marrying Matt, whom he will not call "dad". Denise calls, explaining that ESPN is looking for a new football sportscaster and George must come to the studio to record a tape. George and Denise go to the empty studio and George struggles to record a  professional tape, but eventually gains confidence and records a TV-worthy tape. Immediately afterwards, Denise hops on to the table that he’s standing behind to record and asks him whether or not coaching soccer is different from sportscasting. After he answers, she moves the subject from parents to single moms and eventually herself as she asks him whether she’s a “distraction or inspiration” to him as she unbuttons her dress, revealing her bra. After some slight resistance from George, she seduces him into sex. This causes George to be late to pick up Lewis again, straining his relationship with both Lewis and Stacie.

Arriving home, George is berated by his landlord Param for not paying his rent but driving a Ferrari, and receives a call from Patti that she is in his bed. Realizing she is actually in Param’s bed, George distracts him by paying him with Carl's bribe money. Patti continues to approach George sexually, but he rebuffs her, telling her that she should leave Carl rather than have an affair. His relationship with Lewis worsens when he sees Denise kiss George, leading Lewis to realize why his father was late. Lewis is furthered angered due to noticing George not paying, due to receiving a phone call by Barb mid game, asking whether or not their fling could be a potential relationship, as well as Denise making a motion at George of tugging her ear, which she mentioned earlier right before kissing him that her doing that is a sign of her telling him he’s thinking about George on top of her. This spurs Lewis into fighting during a game, and he tells his mother that he wants to quit football. Coaxing Lewis into playing football in the rain, George and his son bond. Stacie and George reconnect romantically, complicating her relationship with Matt.

George receives the ESPN job thanks to Denise, but he rejects her romantically. The job requires him moving to Connecticut, and he asks Stacie to move with him. Stacie initially refuses to come with him, but he meets her at her car and she kisses him. At that day’s game, George learns Barb is dating Param, and Carl has discovered misleading pictures of Patti in George's house. As George and Carl fight, Stacie is upset by the pictures, and Lewis' team wins the game.

George leaves for his new job, but ultimately chooses to stay with Lewis instead. He renews his relationship with Stacie, who has broken off her engagement with Matt, and becomes a local sportscaster in Virginia.

Cast

Production
The project began as a baseball story called "Confessions of a Little League Coach" but was later changed to soccer. Gerard Butler was confirmed to star in the film on February 23, 2011. On May 7, 2011, a casting call was held for extras to appear in the film.
Filming began during the week of April 5, 2011.

On July 16, 2012, FilmDistrict changed the title from "Playing the Field" to "Playing for Keeps".

Director Muccino later blamed the film’s muddled focus on having thirteen producers, "each wanting a different movie", and also on bad marketing.

Reception

On Rotten Tomatoes, the film has an approval rating of 4% based on 90 reviews, with an average rating of 3.35/10. The website's critical consensus reads, "Witless, unfocused and arguably misogynistic, Playing for Keeps is a dispiriting, lowest-common-denominator Hollywood rom-com." On Metacritic, the film has a weighted average score of 27 out of 100, based on 25 critics, indicating "generally unfavorable reviews". Audiences polled by CinemaScore gave the film an average grade of "B+" on an A+ to F scale.

Roger Ebert of the Chicago Sun-Times gave the film 2 out of 4, and praised Biel for her performance: "Jessica Biel all but steals the show as Stacie".
Justin Chang of Variety wrote: "A modestly affecting reconciliation drama wrapped in a so-so sports movie by way of a misogynistic romantic comedy, Playing for Keeps can't stop tripping all over itself."
Peter Travers of Rolling Stone magazine panned the film and said "Just stay away. It's awful." Writing for The New York Times, Laura Kern listed it as the "Worst Film of 2012".

Accolades

At the 33rd Golden Raspberry Awards, Jessica Biel was nominated in the Worst Supporting Actress category.

References

External links
 
 
 
 
 
 

2012 films
2012 romantic comedy films
American romantic comedy films
Films directed by Gabriele Muccino
Films set in Virginia
Films shot in Louisiana
American association football films
Nu Image films
FilmDistrict films
2010s English-language films
2010s American films